Count Philip of Nassau-Idstein (1450 – 16 June 1509) was the youngest son of Count John II of Nassau-Wiesbaden-Idstein and his wife, Mary of Nassau-Siegen.  In 1470, he married Margaret (1456–1527), the daughter of Count Palatine Louis I "the Black" of Zweibrücken-Veldenz.

After John II died in 1480, Philip ruled Nassau-Idstein, while his elder brother Adolf III ruled Nassau-Wiesbaden.

In 1509, Philip died childless.  His brother Adolf III inherited Nassau-Idstein, thereby reuniting Nassau-Wiesbaden-Idstein.

House of Nassau
Counts of Nassau
1450 births
1509 deaths
15th-century German people